Pennsylvania State Senate District 1 includes part of Philadelphia County. It is currently represented by Democrat Nikil Saval.

District profile
The district includes the following areas:

Philadelphia County:

Ward 01
Ward 02 
Ward 05
Ward 08
Ward 18
Ward 25 [PART, Divisions 01, 04 and 07]
Ward 26 [PART, Divisions 01, 02, 03, 20 and 23]
Ward 30
Ward 31
Ward 39
Ward 40 [PART, Divisions 30, 38 and 40]

Senators

Recent election results

References

Pennsylvania Senate districts
Government of Philadelphia